Live at Roadburn 2008 is the first live album by French post-metal band Year of No Light. 
It was released in August 2009 on LP+DVD, and reissued later on CD in April 2011.

Track listing 
All tracks written by Year of No Light, except The Golden Horn Of The Moon co-written with Fear Falls Burning.

LP version

Side A:
 "Tu As Fait De Moi Un Homme Meilleur" – 4:46
 "Cimmeria" – 5:12
 "Metanoia" – 8:50
 "L'Angoisse Du Veilleur De Nuit D'Autoroute Les Soirs D'Alarme À Accident" – 3:51

Side B:
 "Les Mains De L'Empereur" – 11:52
 "The Golden Horn Of The Moon (Year Of No Light / Fear Falls Burning Improvisation)" – 16:01

CD version
 "Audience Noise / Drones" – 1:08
 "Tu As Fait De Moi Un Homme Meilleur" – 4:46
 "Cimmeria" – 5:12
 "Traversée" – 8:14
 "Metanoia" – 8:50
 "L'Angoisse Du Veilleur De Nuit D'Autoroute Les Soirs D'Alarme À Accident" – 3:51
 "Les Mains De L'Empereur" – 11:52
 "The Golden Horn Of The Moon (Year Of No Light / Fear Falls Burning Improvisation)" – 16:01

Personnel

Band members
 Bertrand Sébenne – drums
 Jérôme Alban – guitar
 Pierre Anouilh – guitar
 Julien Perez – vocals, keyboards
 Johan Sébenne – bass

Other personnel
 Cyrille Gachet – engineering, mixing and mastering
 Emmanuel Romani – live lights
 Greg Vezon – album art and photography
 Richard Schouten – design and layout

Recording
The performance was recorded live at the 13th Roadburn Festival, April 19, 2008 at 013 (The Batcave), Tilburg, The Netherlands. Mixed and mastered by Cyrille Gachet in Bordeaux, France.

Release
Roadburn Records initially released the album in August 2009.
It was only available as an LP/DVD pack (RBR015), in a limited edition of 500 copies in three versions (300 black vinyl, 100 gold [+ a silk-screened poster in bonus], 100 silver), all in gatefold covers, attached with a 61-minute DVD of the live show.

In April 2011, Roadburn Records reissued it on a CD edition (RBR017).

References

Year of No Light albums
2009 live albums